Notomegabalanus concinnus is a species of barnacle in the family Balanidae. The species is harmless to humans and can be found in New Zealand and Argentina. It was described by Charles Darwin in 1854.

References

Crustaceans described in 1854
Barnacles